Romain Marchessou (born September 9, 1985) is a Monegasque weightlifter. Marchessou represented Monaco at the 2008 Summer Olympics in Beijing, where he competed for the men's middleweight category (77 kg). Marchessou placed twenty-fourth in this event, as he successfully lifted 110 kg in the single-motion snatch, and hoisted 140 kg in the two-part, shoulder-to-overhead clean and jerk, for a total of 250 kg.

References

External links
NBC Olympics Profile

Monegasque male weightlifters
1985 births
Living people
Olympic weightlifters of Monaco
Weightlifters at the 2008 Summer Olympics